Jennifer Gutiérrez Bermejo (born 20 February 1995) is a Swiss-born Spanish handballer for Rapid București and the Spanish national team.

She represented Spain at the 2019 World Women's Handball Championship.

References

External links

1995 births
Competitors at the 2018 Mediterranean Games
Living people
Mediterranean Games gold medalists for Spain
Mediterranean Games medalists in handball
People from Horgen
Spanish female handball players
Swiss emigrants to Spain
Swiss people of Spanish descent
Expatriate handball players
Spanish expatriate sportspeople in Germany
Handball players at the 2020 Summer Olympics